Master trooper is a rank used by several state police agencies within the United States and in some world militaries.

In particular, in the Louisiana State Police, in the United States, it is a rank below sergeant, yet above senior trooper.  The insignia for this rank consists of a gold colored 'MT' collar pin worn on the wearer's right lapel. Troopers who complete 15 years of satisfactory or exceptional service are promoted to the rank of master trooper.  The title of address is "master trooper".

Usage in other agencies or countries may vary.  The rank of Master Trooper is used by the following state agencies within the United States:

Colorado State Patrol
Illinois State Police
Indiana State Police
Kansas Highway Patrol
Louisiana State Police
Maryland State Police
North Carolina State Highway Patrol
Virginia State Police
Wisconsin State Patrol
Florida Highway Patrol

See also
Sergeant
Senior Trooper
Trooper first class
Police ranks of the United States

References

Police ranks